Nick Schulman (born September 18, 1984 in New York City) is an American professional poker player and commentator.

Early life

Schulman grew up in New York City, and began playing pool at the famous Amsterdam Billiards. He was mentored by several of the best players in the NYC area from ages 13–19, at which point his focus switched to poker.

Poker career
Schulman began to play poker in 2002, at the age of 18, and by the age of 19 went professional. In 2005, at the age of 21, he won the fourth season World Poker Tour (WPT) World Poker Finals poker tournament, winning $2,167,500, a record for a regular season event on the WPT. He also became the youngest winner of a WPT event.

Less than a month later, Schulman finished 4th in the World Series of Poker circuit event in Atlantic City, winning an additional $74,495.  In April 2006, Schulman won the WPT Battle of Champions IV event, eliminating Freddy Deeb to take the title.  Prior to winning the WPT event, Schulman had regularly played poker on the internet.

On June 12, 2009, Schulman won his first WSOP bracelet in the $10,000 World Championship No Limit Deuce to Seven Draw event, defeating a final table that included John Juanda, David Benyamine, and Michael Binger. In July 2012, he won his second WSOP bracelet in the same event, taking home $294,321 in winnings.

Schulman appeared on the MTV show "World of Jenks" in September 2010. In October 2018, he also made an appearance on PokerGO’s revived version of Poker After Dark and after the retirement of Gabe Kaplan, he replaced him in High Stakes Poker in the second episode of Season 10.

During the 2019 WSOP Main Event, Schulman was doing commentary for the coverage by ESPN and PokerGO. 

He is a regular player in the world’s most famous super high stakes cash game room Bobby’s Room, recently officially renamed “Legends Room”, at the Bellagio, in Las Vegas.

As of February 2023, his total career live tournament winnings exceed $15,300,000.

References

External links
Poker News Daily article on WPT win
Liquidpoker.net interview
Brief bio

1984 births
American poker players
Jewish American sportspeople
Living people
World Poker Tour winners
World Series of Poker bracelet winners
21st-century American Jews